The Providence Children's Museum is a non-profit children's museum in Providence, Rhode Island. The museum is located at 100 South Street in the city's Jewelry District.

In 1976, the museum was founded as the "Rhode Island Children's Museum", the first and currently the only children's museum in the state. Originally, the Pawtucket Congregational Church leased its Pitcher-Goff House to the museum, and the building was renovated with exhibits, play spaces, and activities for children and opened in 1977. In 1997 the museum was renamed the "Providence Children's Museum" and opened its new South Street facility in Providence.

See also
List of museums in Rhode Island

References

External links
Providence Children's Museum Official Website

Museums in Providence, Rhode Island
Museums established in 1976
Children's museums in Rhode Island